Brian Calabrese (born 17 April 1996) is an Argentine footballer who plays as a winger or attacker for Walter Ferretti.

Career

In 2014, Calabrese signed for Argentine fourth division side Central Córdoba (Rosario). Before the 2016 season, he signed for Olimpo in the Argentine top flight. In 2016, he signed for Argentine third division club . Before the 2018 season, Calabrese signed for Pantoja in the Dominican Republic. In 2019, he signed for Omani team Mirbat, where he was unpaid for 7 months and said, "A normal day is 40 °, it's hell. At the beginning we trained at 6:30 p.m. and then we went to training at 7:00 p.m. The debut match was postponed three times due to high temperatures." In 2020, Calabrese signed for Villa Mitre in Argentina. In 2021, he signed for Nicaraguan outfit Walter Ferretti.

References

External links

 
 

Argentine footballers
Argentine expatriate sportspeople in the Dominican Republic
Argentine expatriate sportspeople in Nicaragua
Argentine expatriate sportspeople in Oman
Argentine expatriate footballers
Expatriate footballers in Nicaragua
Expatriate footballers in the Dominican Republic
Living people
Association football wingers
Association football forwards
Argentine people of Italian descent
Villa Mitre footballers
Central Córdoba de Rosario footballers
Torneo Federal A players
1996 births
Nicaraguan Primera División players
C.D. Walter Ferretti players
Atlético Pantoja players
Expatriate footballers in Oman